Towns and cities in England can be defined either by their local government administrative boundaries or by their physical extent.

 List of cities in the United Kingdom, including the 51 cities in England, seven in Scotland, six in Wales, and five in Northern Ireland
 List of towns and cities in England by historical population
 Settlements in ceremonial counties of England by population sets out the population of each city, town and village with 5,000 or more residents per county.
 List of English districts by population sets out the population of each non-metropolitan district, London borough, metropolitan borough, and unitary authority in England.
 List of urban areas in the United Kingdom sets out the population of each built-up area in England and the wider United Kingdom, as defined by the Office for National Statistics.

See also
 List of towns in England
 City status in the United Kingdom

Populated places in England by county
Urban areas of England
Counties of England
Local government in England